Soft Samba Strings is a 1965 album by jazz arranger and vibraphonist Gary McFarland.

Reception
Douglas Payne reviewed the album for AllMusic and compared it dismissively to Soft Samba writing that it was "A misleading title that has less to do with Soft Samba and more to do with McFarland's similar feature for Zoot Sims (Waiting Game). Rather dull, perhaps because a strong soloist like Sims is missing".

Track listing
 "Full Moon and Empty Arms" (Buddy Kaye, Ted Mossman) – 2:20
 "Skylark" (Hoagy Carmichael, Johnny Mercer) – 3:00
 "I Know The Meaning" (Pyotr Ilyich Tchaikovsky) – 3:07
 "Manhã de Carnaval (Morning of the Carnival)" (Luiz Bonfá, Antônio Maria) – 2:50
 "The Lamp Is Low" (Bert Shefter, Mitchell Parish, Peter DeRose) – 4:55
 "My Reverie" (Larry Clinton, Claude Debussy) – 2:50
 "These Are the Things I Love" (Harold Barlow, Lew Harris) – 2:15
 "Theme From "13"" (Gary McFarland) – 2:20
 "Once We Loved" (McFarland) – 1:45
 "Our Love" (Buddy Bernier, Larry Clinton, Robert D. Emmerich) – 2:20

Personnel
Gary McFarland - arranger, vibraphone, vocals
Jack Parnell – conductor

Production
Creed Taylor - producer
Pete Turner, Acy Lehmann - cover design
Rudy Van Gelder - engineer (Englewood Cliffs)
Jack Clegg – engineer (London)
Val Valentin - director of engineering

References

1967 albums
Albums arranged by Gary McFarland
Albums produced by Creed Taylor
Albums recorded at Van Gelder Studio
Bossa nova albums
Gary McFarland albums
Verve Records albums